Sanjay Lal (born July 23, 1969) is an American football coach who is the wide receivers coach and passing game coordinator for the Seattle Seahawks of the National Football League (NFL). He previously served as an assistant coach for the Jacksonville Jaguars, Indianapolis Colts, Buffalo Bills, New York Jets, Oakland Raiders, and Dallas Cowboys.

Early life
Born in London, Lal enrolled at the University of California, Los Angeles (UCLA), and played college football for the UCLA Bruins in 1989, and was a member of the 1989 Cotton Bowl Classic winning team. He then transferred to the University of Washington, where he played for the Washington Huskies from 1990 through 1992. He was a member of the Huskies' national championship team in 1992. Additionally, the Husky Hall of Fame selection was a member of two Rose Bowl teams while at UW.

After graduating from Washington with a degree in business administration (1993), Lal was invited to the Oakland Raiders' training camp and subsequently signed as a free agent with the St. Louis Rams (1998) and then with the Scottish Claymores of NFL Europe (1999).

Coaching career

Early career
In 1996, Sanjay was hired as the passing game coordinator and wide receivers coach at Miramonte High School. During his tenure, the school won five North Coast Section Championships and one state title, including a 13-0 record in 2001.

Oakland Raiders
In 2007, Lal was hired by the Oakland Raiders as an offensive quality control coach under head coach Lane Kiffin. In 2009, he was promoted to wide receivers coach under head coach Tom Cable. During his tenure with the Raiders, he coached and developed young receivers such as Chaz Schilens, Darrius Heyward-Bey, Louis Murphy, Jacoby Ford, and Denarius Moore.

New York Jets
On January 13, 2013, Lal was hired by the New York Jets as their wide receivers coach.

Indianapolis Colts
On January 25, 2017, Lal was hired by the Indianapolis Colts as their wide receivers coach under head coach Chuck Pagano.

Dallas Cowboys
On January 14, 2018, Lal was hired by the Dallas Cowboys as their wide receivers coach, replacing Derek Dooley, who left to become the offensive coordinator and quarterbacks coach at the University of Missouri. On January 8, 2020, the Cowboys announced Lal would not be retained under new head coach Mike McCarthy.

Seattle Seahawks 
On March 11, 2020, Lal was hired by the Seattle Seahawks as a senior offensive assistant.

Jacksonville Jaguars
On January 27, 2021, Lal was hired by the Jacksonville Jaguars as their wide receivers coach under head coach Urban Meyer.

References

External links
 Seattle Seahawks profile

Living people
Buffalo Bills coaches
California Golden Bears football coaches
Oakland Raiders coaches
New York Jets coaches
UCLA Bruins football players
Sportspeople from London
1969 births
Washington Huskies football players
Indianapolis Colts coaches
Dallas Cowboys coaches
Seattle Seahawks coaches
Jacksonville Jaguars coaches